Hesitation Blues is a compilation album by American folk and blues singer Dave Van Ronk, released in 1988.

History
The 16 songs in the compilation come from three '60s Prestige LPs —  Dave Van Ronk, Folksinger, In the Tradition, and the original Inside Dave Van Ronk. Most of the songs appear on the Fantasy compilation CD Inside Dave Van Ronk.

Reception

Writing for Allmusic, critic Richie Unterberger wrote of the album "Good compilation of 16 songs from three '60s Prestige LPs... that probably represent his peak as a recording artist."

Track listing 
"Samson and Delilah" (Traditional) – 2:35 
"Fixin' to Die" (White) – 2:52	 
"Long John" (Traditional) – 2:08
"Motherless Children" (Traditional) – 3:48 
"I Buyed Me a Little Dog"
"Poor Lazarus" (Traditional) – 5:08
"Cruel Ship's Captain	 Traditional)
"Kansas City Blues" (Jackson) – 2:10 
"House Carpenter" (Traditional)
"Fair and Tender Ladies" (Traditional)
"Hesitation Blues" (Davis) – 3:32 
"Hang Me, Oh Hang Me" (Traditional)
"Come Back Baby" (Davis)
"Sprig of Thyme" (Traditional)
"Silver Dagger" (Traditional)
"Death Letter Blues" (Traditional)

Personnel
Dave Van Ronk – vocals, guitar

References

1988 compilation albums
Dave Van Ronk compilation albums